The 2012 Big 12 Conference women's basketball championship, known for sponsorship reasons as the 2012 Phillips 66 Big 12 Women's Basketball Championship, was the 2012 edition of the Big 12 Conference's championship tournament.  The tournament will be held at the Municipal Auditorium in Kansas City from 7 March until 10 March 2012.  The Quarterfinals, Semifinals, and Finals were televised on Fox Sports Net. The championship game will be held on March 10, 2012.

Seeding

Schedule

Bracket

All Times Central
* – Denotes overtime

All-Tournament Team
Most Outstanding Player – Brittney Griner, Baylor

See also
2012 Big 12 Conference men's basketball tournament
2012 NCAA Women's Division I Basketball Tournament
2011–12 NCAA Division I women's basketball rankings

References

External links
 Official 2012 Big 12 Women's Basketball Tournament Bracket

Tournament
Big 12 Conference women's basketball tournament
Big 12 Conference women's basketball tournament
Big 12 Conference women's basketball tournament